The Petite rivière Noire (in English: Little Black River) is a tributary of the Saint-François River. It flows north-west through the municipalities of Saint-Bonaventure and Saint-Pie-de-Guire, in the regional county municipality (MRC) of Drummond Regional County Municipality, in the administrative region of Centre-du-Québec, on the South Shore of the Saint Lawrence River, in Quebec, Canada.

Geography 

The main neighboring hydrographic slopes of the "Little Black River" are:
 north side: Saint-François River;
 east side: Saint-François River, Joseph-Paul Hus stream;
 south side: rivière aux Vaches;
 west side: rivière aux Vaches, Georges-Lemaire stream.

This headland is located in the "Grantham-Ouest" sector, north of highway 20 and west of the town of Drummondville.

The "Petite Rivière Noire" flows on the west bank of the Saint-François River in a zone of rapids, downstream from "Le Trou-d'Abraham" and upstream from "Rapides au Bélier".

Toponymy 

The toponym "Petite rivière Noire" was officially registered on December 5, 1968, at the Commission de toponymie du Québec.

See also 
 List of rivers of Quebec

References 

Rivers of Centre-du-Québec
Drummond Regional County Municipality